Weather and Forecasting is a scientific journal published by the American Meteorological Society.
Articles on forecasting and analysis techniques, forecast verification studies, and case studies useful to forecasters.  In addition, submissions that report on changes to the suite of operational numerical models and statistical post-processing techniques, and articles that demonstrate the transfer of research results to the forecasting community.

See also 
 List of scientific journals
 List of scientific journals in earth and atmospheric sciences

External links 
 AMS publication site

Meteorology journals
Publications established in 1986
Bimonthly journals
English-language journals
American Meteorological Society academic journals